The 2009 Melanesian Championships in Athletics took place between August 4–8, 2009. The event was held at the Griffith University in Gold Coast, Queensland, Australia, jointly with the OAA Grand Prix Series, and the OAA sub-regional Micronesian and Polynesian Championships.  Many athletes utilised the competitions preparing for the upcoming IAAF World Championships in Berlin, Germany.  Detailed reports were given for the OAA.

A total of 34 events were contested, 18 by men and 16 by women.

Medal summary
Complete results can be found on the Oceania Athletics Association webpage, and at sportfieber.pytalhost.com.

In 100 metres, 400 metres hurdles, long jump and triple jump, as well as in shot put, discus throw, and javelin throw, there were separate open competitions for the Melanesian championships and the OAA Grand Prix Series held on different days.

Men

Women

Medal table (unofficial)

Participation
According to an unofficial count, 85 athletes from 7 countries participated.

 (24)
 (19)
 (5)
 (1)
 (21)
 (6)
 (9)

References

Melanesian Championships in Athletics
International athletics competitions hosted by Australia
Melanesian Championships in Athletics
Melanesian Championships in Athletics
August 2009 sports events in Australia